Travel Sentry is a company that develops and licenses standards used in travel security, including a standard for luggage locks that can be opened by aviation security agencies such as the Transportation Security Administration (TSA).

History
Travel Sentry was founded in 2003. The first locks manufactured to the Travel Sentry Approved standards went on sale on November 12, 2003. Initially, only key and combination padlocks were manufactured using this standard. In 2004, the first luggage with integrated Travel Sentry locks were introduced.

As of 2019 there are over 500 million Travel Sentry locks and luggage in circulation.

Luggage locks

Travel Sentry developed a lock system that is "accepted and recognized" by the TSA, Canadian Air Transport Security Authority (CATSA) and other security agencies, and allows them, using special tools and codes, to open and re-lock locks. The tools provided by Travel Sentry are at every luggage screening checkpoint at all 450 airports controlled by the TSA.

Travel Sentry says the system is used at all airports in the USA and Canada, and at least some major airports in Austria, Belgium, Canada, China, Czech Republic, Denmark, Finland, Germany, Israel, Japan, Netherlands, South Korea, Switzerland and Togo, however security agencies in countries other than the USA don't publicly state that luggage needs to be openable.

The system is licensed to over 500 companies worldwide: primarily luggage brands, lock manufacturers and distributors of travel goods.

Gallery

Master key compromise 
In a 2014 article in the Washington Post a picture of the special tools was included, and while this picture was later removed it quickly spread. Security researchers have pointed out that it is now possible for anyone to make new master keys and open the locks without any sign of entry, and the locks can now be considered compromised. It is likely that professional thieves have possessed the master keys well before the publication, perhaps by reverse engineering the TSA-approved locks, and a photo of the keys was previously uploaded in 2011.

See also
Okoban

References

External links 
 
https://www.okoban.com/

2003 establishments in New Hampshire
Companies established in 2003
Companies based in Strafford County, New Hampshire
Travel-related organizations